Hardboard, also called high-density fiberboard (HDF), is a type of fiberboard, which is an engineered wood product. It is used in furniture and in the construction industry.

Description
Hardboard is similar to particle board and medium-density fiberboard, but is denser and much stronger and harder because it is made out of exploded wood fibers that have been highly compressed. It differs from particle board in that the bonding of the wood fibers requires no additional adhesive, the original lignin in the wood fibers sufficing to bond the hardboard together, although resin is often added. 

Hardboard is produced in either a wet or dry process. The wet process, known as the Mason Method, leaves one smooth side and one textured side, while the dry processed hardboard is smooth on both sides. Masonite is produced using the wet process only.

History 
A product resembling hardboard was first made in England in 1898 by hot pressing waste paper. In the 1900s, fiber building board of relatively low density was manufactured in Canada. In the early 1920s, improved methods of compressing wet wood pulp at high temperatures resulted in a higher density product.

Uses
Unlike solid wood, hardboard is very homogeneous with no grain. A wood veneer can be glued onto it to give the appearance of solid wood. Other overlays include Formica, laminated papers, ceramics, and vinyl. It has many uses, such as a substrate. It is used in construction, flooring, furniture, home appliances, automobiles and cabinetry, and is popular among acrylic and oil painters as a painting surface due to its economical price (though it must be coated with gesso or canvas before use). Hardboard has often been used as the surface material in clipboards, especially older models. It is also used as the final layer in many skateboard ramps and the half-pipe. Hardboard is also used extensively in theatrical environments, often used as the final painted surface of a stage and on walking surfaces of constructed scenery.  Hardboard is also used to make puzzles, game boards, and other toys.

Tempered hardboard is hardboard that has been coated with a thin film of linseed oil and then baked; this gives it more water resistance, impact resistance, hardness, rigidity and tensile strength. Tempered hardboard is used in construction siding.

Perforated hardboard, also called pegboard, is tempered hardboard that has a uniform array of  holes in it, into which tool-hanging hooks or store fixtures can be placed.

Hardboard has become less popular in the construction industry in recent years due to new environmental targets to procure more sustainable temporary protection materials.

See also
 Fibro (fibrous asbestos cement board)
 Glued laminated timber
 Oriented strand board
 Plywood
 Pressed wood
 Masonite

Citations

Works cited 
 Akers, L. E. (1966). Particle Board and Hardboard. Oxford: Pergamon Press. .
 Frane, J. T. (1994). Craftsman's Illustrated Dictionary of Construction Terms. Carlsbad, CA: Craftsman Book. .

External links

 Composite Panel Association: Hardboard
 European Panel Federation: Hardboard

Engineered wood

ru:Оргалит